The Sanremo Music Festival 2009 was the 59th annual Sanremo Music Festival. It was held at the Teatro Ariston in Sanremo, province of Imperia, during the five nights between 17 February 2009 and 21 February 2009, and it was broadcast by Rai 1. Tha last night of the show was also broadcast live by RTV21 in Albania, RTK in Kosovo and by RSI in Switzerland.

The artistic director of the contest was Paolo Bonolis, supported by Gianmarzo Mazzi. Bonolis also presented the show, together with Luca Laurenti.
The competition was divided into two different sections. The "Big Artists" section included sixteen well-known singers, performing a previously unheard song, and it was won by Marco Carta's "La forza mia". The "Newcomers" section, featuring ten debuting or little known artists, was won by Arisa, performing the song "Sincerità". For the first time, a third section was added. Called Sanremofestival.59, it was completely held through the web, and it was won by Ania with the song "Buongiorno gente".

The first half of the inaugural episode was the most viewed TV programme in Italy in 2009, with more than 14 million viewers.

Presenters and personnel

The presenter of the festival, Paolo Bonolis, was announced during a press conference on 11 September 2008 by Rai 1 director Fabrizio Del Noce. Bonolis was also the artistic director of the show, while Gianmarco Mazzi was the musical director of the contest.

Bonolis later confirmed Luca Laurenti, his long-time stage partner, as the co-presenter of the show. During each night, they were joined by a male model and a female celebrity
co-presenting the show—Paul Sculfor and Alessia Piovan on the first night, Nir Lavi and Eleonora Abbagnato on the second one, Thyago Alves and Gabriella Pession on the third night, Ivan Olita on the fourth night, David Gandy and Maria De Filippi on the final.

During the show, the Sanremo Festival Orchestra was directed by Bruno Santori. The scenography was created by Gaetano Castelli, while the authors of the show were Barbara Cappi, Cesare Lanza, Marco Salvati and Sergio Rubino.

Selections

Newcomers section
Two of the artists competing in the newcomers section were selected through the contest SanremoLab, organized by the Comune di Sanremo.
During the first step of the contest, eight artists were selected by a jury composed of Massimo Cotto, Franco Zanetti, Paolo Giordano, Massimo Poggini, Andrea Rodini and Maurilio Giordana. The winners—Emily Novak, Simona Molinari, Elisa Casile, Arisa, Edea, Manola Moslehi, Federica Celio and Erika Mineo—were announced on 5 December 2008. On 11 December 2008, they auditioned in front of a different jury, presided by Paolo Bonolis and Gianmarco Mazzi, and on the following day Arisa and Simona Molinari were announced as the first two confirmed competing artists in the Newcomers section of the Sanremo Music Festival 2009.

The remaining eight artists—Karima Ammar, Silvia Aprile, Irene Fornaciari, Iskra, Filippo Perbellini, Chiara Canzian, Malika Ayane and Barbara Gilbo—were chosen through an internal selection, and announced on 22 December 2008, together with the list of participants in the "Big Artists" section.

Big Artists section
All the artists in the Big Artists section were selected through an internal selection. 104 songs were submitted for the selection, and the sixteen chosen artists—Afterhours, Albano, Alexia with Mario Lavezzi, Marco Carta, Dolcenera, Gemelli Diversi, Fausto Leali, Nicky Nicolai with Stefano Di Battista, Patty Pravo, Povia, Pupo with Paolo Belli and Youssou N'Dour, Francesco Renga, Sal da Vinci, Francesco Tricarico and Iva Zanicchi—were announced on 22 December 2008, together with the selected songs.

Nights

First night

Big Artists section

Newcomers section

Second night

Big Artists section

Newcomers section

Third night

Newcomers section

Repechage round

Fourth night

Big Artists section

Newcomers section

Fifth night

First round

Second round

Other awards

Critics Award "Mia Martini"

Big Artists section

Newcomers section

Press, Radio & TV Award

Big Artists section

Newcomers section
 Winner: Arisa with "Sincerità".

Sanremofestival.59
The contest Sanremofestival.59 was a singing contest held through the web and strictly related to the Sanremo Music Festival 2009. 470 songs were submitted and published on the official website of the Sanremo Music Festival. Each artist was later auditioned by a jury composed of Paolo Bonolis, Gianmarco Mazzi, Gigio D'Ambrosio, Mariolina Simone and Maria Cristina De Amicis, and 100 songs were admitted to the next stage of the competition.

The winner of the contest was determined by the public's vote only. On 19 February 2012, it was announced that Ania placed first with the song "Buongiorno gente". During the last night of the show, she received the award and she performed her song at the Teatro Ariston.

Ratings

Notes

Sanremo Music Festival by year
2009 in Italian music
2009 song contests
2009 in Italian television